

260001–260100 

|-id=098
| 260098 Staargyula ||  || Gyula Staar (born 1944) is a major figure of Hungarian scientific journalism. He has conducted long interviews with prominent mathematicians and physicists, most of which were also published in book form. He is the winner of the 2018 annual science communication award of the Club of Hungarian Science Journalists. || 
|}

260101–260200 

|-bgcolor=#f2f2f2
| colspan=4 align=center | 
|}

260201–260300 

|-id=235
| 260235 Attwood ||  || Randy Attwood (born 1957), a Canadian editor who has served as national President of the Royal Astronomical Society of Canada. || 
|}

260301–260400 

|-id=366
| 260366 Quanah ||  || Quanah Parker (c. 1852–1911), Native American and last chief of the Comanche Nation || 
|}

260401–260500 

|-bgcolor=#f2f2f2
| colspan=4 align=center | 
|}

260501–260600 

|-id=508
| 260508 Alagna ||  || Roberto Alagna (born 1963), a French tenor of Sicilian origin. || 
|}

260601–260700 

|-
| 260601 Wesselényi ||  || Miklós Wesselényi (1796–1850), a Hungarian statesman, leader of the upper house of the Diet, member of the Board of Academy of Sciences, and a hero of the 1838 Pest flood. || 
|-id=676
| 260676 Evethuriere ||  || Evelyne Gerlic, born Thurière (1944–2013), a researcher in nuclear physics, who worked at the French National Center for Scientific Research (CNRS), France. || 
|}

260701–260800 

|-id=724
| 260724 Malherbe ||  || Francois de Malherbe (1555–1628), a French poet and a great defender of the purity of French language. || 
|}

260801–260900 

|-id=824
| 260824 Hermanus ||  || Hermanus, a South African coastal town previously named  "Hermanuspietersfontein", which was founded in honor of the man who taught Dutch to farmers' children || 
|-id=886
| 260886 Henritudor ||  || Henri Owen Tudor (1859–1928), a Luxembourgish engineer and inventor. || 
|}

260901–261000 

|-id=906
| 260906 Robichon ||  || Noël Robichon  (born 1967), a French astronomer, working at the Paris-Meudon Observatory. || 
|}

References 

260001-261000